Juan Ponce de León (1474–1521) was an early Spanish explorer who is credited as being the first European to land in North America, and was the first colonial governor of Puerto Rico.

Ponce de León may also refer to:

Places
 Ponce de Leon, Florida, a town in the northern Florida panhandle
 Ponce de León Hotel, a former hotel in St. Augustine, Florida, now part of Flagler College
 Ponce de Leon Springs State Park, a park in the Florida panhandle
 Ponce de León Inlet, an inlet of the Atlantic Ocean on the east coast of Florida
 Ponce de Leon Inlet Light, a lighthouse in Florida at Ponce de Leon Inlet
 Ponce de León Island, a barrier island on the Atlantic coast of Florida
 Ponce de Leon amusement park, a former amusement park in Atlanta, Georgia
 Ponce de Leon Avenue, a thoroughfare in Atlanta, Georgia
 Ponce de Leon Park, a former baseball park in Atlanta, Georgia
 Ponce de Leon Springs (Atlanta), former springs in Atlanta, Georgia
 Ponce de Leon Apartments, part of the Fox Theatre Historic District, Midtown Atlanta, Georgia
 Ponce de Leon, Missouri, an unincorporated community
 Avenida Juan Ponce de León, a thoroughfare in San Juan, Puerto Rico

Other uses
 Ponce de Leon (train), a train operated by the Southern Railway in the southeast United States
 House of Ponce de León, a noble house
 Ponce de Leon, a, 1804 play by Clemens Brentano

People with the name
 Alberto Yarini y Ponce de León (1882–1910), Cuban criminal 
 Alfonso Ponce de León (1906-1936), Spanish painter
 Antonio Ponce de León, 11th Duke of Arcos (1726–1780), military officer
 Daniel Ponce de León (born 1980), Mexican boxer
 Daniel Ponce de Leon (born 1992), American baseball player
 Diego de Alvear y Ponce de León (1749–1830), Spanish military commander and politician
 Diego de Vargas (Diego de Vargas Zapata y Luján Ponce de León y Contreras, 1643–1704), Spanish governor of the New Spain territory of Santa Fe de Nuevo México, today the U.S. states of New Mexico and Arizona
 Ernesto Zedillo Ponce de León (born 1951), President of Mexico from 1994 to 2000
 Fernando Ponce de León (1917–1998), Colombian writer
 Fidelio Ponce de León (1895–1949), Cuban painter
 Gisela Ponce de León (born 1985), Peruvian actress and singer
 Juan Ponce de León II (1524–1591), grandson of Juan Ponce de León and the first native-born Puerto Rican to become governor of Puerto Rico
 Juan Ponce de León y Loayza, son of Juan Ponce de León II, and early settler of Ponce, Puerto Rico
 Luis Ponce de León (governor of New Spain) (fl. 1525–1526), Spanish governor of New Spain
 Luis Ponce de León (1527–1591), Spanish poet 
 Michael Ponce de Leon (1922–2006) American artist
 Nicolás Ponce de León (1590/95–1654), acting governor of Florida in 1631-1633 and 1651
 Nicolás Suárez Ponce de León II, acting governor of Florida in 1663–1664, and 1673–1675
 Patricio Ponce de León (1919–2010), Cuban mycologist
 Pedro Ponce de León (1520–1584) Spanish Benedictine monk who is often credited as being "the first teacher for the deaf"
 Pedro Ponce de León the Elder (fl. 1330–1352), Castilian nobleman
 Pedro Ponce de León (bishop of Plasencia) (1509–1573), Spanish bishop
 Pedro Ponce de Léon (bishop of Zamora) (born 1561), Spanish bishop
 Pedro Ponce de León y Riquelme, Governor of Venezuela Province (1566–1569)
 Rodrigo Ponce de León, Duke of Cádiz (1443–1492), Castilian military leader
 Rodrigo Ponce de León, 4th Duke of Arcos (1602–1658), viceroy of Naples (r. 1646–48)

Fictional
 Augusto Ponce de León, a character in Camaleones